Menephilus is a genus of beetles belonging to the family Tenebrionidae.

The species of this genus are found in Europe, Africa and Japan.

Species:
 Menephilus cylindricus (Herbst, 1784) 
 Menephilus formosanus Masumoto, 1981

References

Tenebrionidae
Beetles of Europe
Beetles of Africa
Insects of Japan